The Mausoleum of Avicenna (Persian: آرامگاه‌ بوعلی سینا) is a monumental complex located at Avicenna Square, Hamadan, Iran.

Dedicated to the Persian polymath Avicenna, the complex includes a library, a small museum, and a spindle-shaped tower inspired by the Ziyarid-era Kavus Tower.

History
Designed by Hooshang Seyhoun, it was built in 1952, replacing an older building dedicated to Avicenna which was destroyed in 1950.

The Pahlavi government had plans to build the mausoleum since at least 1939. The mausoleum was eventually dedicated in a grand ceremony in May 1954, and the avenue running in front of it was also renamed in honor of Avicenna.

As the monument was a central element of the propagation of Iranian nationalism by the Pahlavi government, it was consequently in danger of being defaced, but as Khomeini himself was an admirer of Avicenna, the square was not renamed after the 1979 Revolution.

Gallery

References

Pope, Arthur Upham. Persian Architecture.  Tandem Verlag GmbH., 2007.

External links

http://himetop.wikidot.com/avicenna-s-mausoleum

Avicenna
Buildings and structures completed in 1952
Museums in Iran
Hamadan
Buildings and structures in Hamadan Province
Tourist attractions in Hamadan Province
Mausoleums in Iran
Hooshang Seyhoun buildings